Xinjian is a town in Yixing, Jiangsu province, China. , it has one residential community and 6 villages under its administration.

See also 
 List of township-level divisions of Jiangsu

References 

Township-level divisions of Jiangsu
Yixing